Parthian Kings is a 1983 video game published by The Avalon Hill Game Company for the Apple II and Commodore 64. It was designed by David W. Bradley.

Gameplay
Parthian Kings is a game in which the King has died, and the player competes with opponents to gain control of the crown.

Reception
Curtis Edwards reviewed the game for Computer Gaming World, and stated that "As a good example of the new crop of military games with a fantasy setting, PK has those features which should insure that you will continue to play it for a long time to come."

References

External links

Review in Softalk
Review in Family Computing
Review in Electronic Games
Review in Washington Apple Pi

1983 video games
Apple II games
Avalon Hill video games
Commodore 64 games
Computer wargames
Turn-based strategy video games
Video games developed in the United States
Video games set in antiquity
Video games set in Iran